Francis Cornet (born 14 March 1947) is a Belgian former sports shooter. He competed at the 1968 Summer Olympics and the 1972 Summer Olympics.

References

External links
 

1947 births
Living people
Belgian male sport shooters
Olympic shooters of Belgium
Shooters at the 1968 Summer Olympics
Shooters at the 1972 Summer Olympics
People from Etterbeek
Sportspeople from Brussels
20th-century Belgian people